Luigi Ciotti OMRI (born in Pieve di Cadore (province of Belluno), September 10, 1945), is an Italian priest belonging to the Roman Catholic Archdiocese of Turin, deeply involved in the fight against illegality and organized crime such as the Mafia.

Biography
Luigi Ciotti emigrated with his family to Turin in 1950. He was ordained priest in 1972 by Cardinal Michele Pellegrino, who assigned him to the “parish” of the streets of Turin.

Ciotti's involvement with social work started in 1966, when he founded Gruppo Abele (Abel's Group) to follow drug addicts held in Juvenile Detention Centers. In 1982, he founded CNCA, the national network of organizations dedicated to charitable hospitality. In 1987 he was appointed the first president of the Italian League against AIDS (LILA), founded by Franco Grillini and others in 1986. On March 25, 1995 he set up the association Libera (Free), to coordinate efforts by Italian organizations against organized crime.

Publications
In 1988 Ciotti started to write for newspapers and specialized magazines dealing with social work and public education. In February 1993 he published the first issue of the monthly magazine Narcomafie (Narcotics Mafias). He has authored several books dealing with educational and social problems, such as Genitori, figli e droga (Parents, Children and Drugs), written in collaboration with Vaccaro, and Chi ha paura delle mele marce, (Who is afraid of Rotten Apples).

Honors
On July 1, 1998, Ciotti received an Honorary Degree in Education from the University of Bologna. He is also a recipient of the Cavaliere Gran Croce dell'Ordine al Merito (Cavalier Grand Cross of the Order of Merit) from the Italian Government.
On June 23, 2007, he received the "Premio Speciale San Bernardo" (Special Prize St. Bernard) for his endeavors to solve social problems.

See also
Drug addiction
Drug rehabilitation
Illegal drug trade
Streetwise priest

External links

Luigi Ciotti - Enciclopedia Multimediale delle Scienze Filosofiche (Multimedia Encyclopedia of Philosophical Sciences)
Associazione Gruppo Abele Onlus
Narcomafie (Narcotics Mafias)
libera.it - association against the Mafia, official site

1945 births
Antimafia
Italian educational theorists
Clergy from Turin
20th-century Italian Roman Catholic priests
Living people
Recipients of the European Citizen's Prize